Dastgerdan District is a district (bakhsh) in Tabas County, South Khorasan Province, Iran. At the 2006 census, its population was 11,659, in 3,246 families.  The District has one city: Eshqabad. The District has two rural districts (dehestan): Dastgerdan Rural District and Kuh Yakhab Rural District.

References 

Districts of South Khorasan Province
Tabas County